Ștefan Augustin Doinaș (pen name of Ștefan Popa) (April 26, 1922 – May 25, 2002) was a Romanian Neoclassical poet of the Communist era.

Doinaș was born in Cherechiu, Bihor County. After completing high school in Arad, he studied philology in Sibiu, where the University of Cluj had moved in the wake of the Hungarian occupation of Northern Transylvania. Here he joined the Sibiu Literary Circle, a group formed around Lucian Blaga.

Doinaș published his first volume of poems, Cartea mareelor, in 1964. Some of his most famous works include: Omul cu compasul, Seminția lui Laokoon, Anotimpul discret, Interiorul unui poem and Lamentații.  In 1992, he became a member of the Romanian Academy, and in 2002, honorary president of the Writers' Union of Romania.

Doinaș died of throat cancer in Bucharest. That night, his wife Silvia Lia Popa, a former first ballerina whom he had married in 1958, committed suicide.

Presence in English Language Anthologies

 Testament - 400 Years of Romanian Poetry - 400 de ani de poezie românească - bilingual edition - Daniel Ioniță (editor and principal translator) with Daniel Reynaud, Adriana Paul & Eva Foster - Editura Minerva, 2019 - 
 Romanian Poetry from its Origins to the Present - bilingual edition English/Romanian - Daniel Ioniță (editor and principal translator) with Daniel Reynaud, Adriana Paul and Eva Foster - Australian-Romanian Academy Publishing - 2020 - ; 
 Born in Utopia - An anthology of Modern and Contemporary Romanian Poetry - Carmen Firan and Paul Doru Mugur (editors) with Edward Foster - Talisman House Publishers - 2006 - 
 Testament - Anthology of Romanian Verse - American Edition - monolingual English language edition - Daniel Ioniță (editor and principal translator) with Eva Foster, Daniel Reynaud and Rochelle Bews - Australian-Romanian Academy for Culture - 2017 -

References

External links
 http://www.romanianvoice.com/poezii/poeti/doinas.php

1922 births
2002 deaths
People from Sântana
Babeș-Bolyai University alumni
Romanian male poets
20th-century Romanian poets
20th-century Romanian male writers
Titular members of the Romanian Academy
Deaths from esophageal cancer
Deaths from cancer in Romania